Lipinia surda, the Malaysian striped skink, is a species of skink found in Malaysia and Thailand.

References

Lipinia
Reptiles of Malaysia
Reptiles of Thailand
Reptiles described in 1900
Taxa named by George Albert Boulenger